Lukáš Michna (born 28 April 1990) is a Czech football player who played for FC Zbrojovka Brno.

References

External links

1990 births
Living people
Czech footballers
Czech First League players
FC Zbrojovka Brno players

Association football midfielders
Footballers from Brno